Karman-Aktau (Qarman-Aqtaw) is a rural locality (a selo) in Voyadinsky Selsoviet, Yanaulsky District, Bashkortostan, Russia. The population was 65 as of 2010. There are 2 streets.

Geography 
Karman-Aktau is located 37 km west of Yanaul (the district's administrative centre) by road. Akylbay is the nearest rural locality.

References 

Rural localities in Yanaulsky District